SSY may refer to:
 Simpson Spence & Young, a shipping company
 ISO 639:ssy, the ISO 639 code for the Saho language
 Mbanza Congo Airport, the IATA code SSY
 SciSys, the London Stock Exchange code SSY